Jon García may refer to:
 Jon García (taekwondo) (born 1977), Spanish taekwondo athlete
 Jon García (footballer) (born 1991), Spanish footballer 
 Jon Garcia (director) (born 1979), American director, documentary filmmaker, screenwriter and musician

See also
Jonathan Garcia (born 1986), American speed skater
 John Garcia (disambiguation)